Nikita Denisovich Kozlov (born 4 April 1997) is a Russian football player.

Club career
He made his debut in the Russian Professional Football League for FC Chita on 4 August 2018 in a game against FC Irtysh Omsk.

References

External links
 Profile by Russian Professional Football League
 
 

1997 births
Sportspeople from Tomsk
Living people
Russian footballers
Association football midfielders
FC Khimki players
FC Naftan Novopolotsk players
FC Chita players
FC Sakhalin Yuzhno-Sakhalinsk players
Russian Second League players
Belarusian First League players
Russian expatriate footballers
Expatriate footballers in Belarus
Russian expatriate sportspeople in Belarus